The Basilica of Notre Dame of Geneva is a Roman Catholic church and Minor Basilica located in Geneva, Switzerland.  It is dedicated to the Blessed Virgin Mary. 

Pope Pius IX gifted the white Carrara marble statue of the Immaculate Conception as Our Lady of Geneva in 1859.   Pope Pius XI granted the image a decree of Pontifical coronation on 26 April 1936. The rite of coronation was executed via the Papal nuncio Filippo Bernardini on 23 May 1937. Pope Pius XII later issued a pontifical decree “Nominis Catholici” which raised the shrine to the status of minor basilica on 4 August 1954.

The motto of Our Lady of Geneva is Nuntia pacis, Latin for "Messenger of peace".  The shrine is a common stopover for pilgrims going to Santiago de Compostela. The basilica marks somehow the beginning of the "via Gebennensis", which extends from Le Puy-en-Velay in via Podiensis.

History 

The church was built according to the design of Alexandre Grigny between 1852 and 1857 on the site of a former stronghold fortifications. This neo-Gothic building, whose appearance is partly inspired by the Beauvais Cathedral, could break ground thanks to the city of Geneva, which had ceded land to religious communities to build places of worship, and through donations and manual labor provided by the Geneva Catholics.

The dedication is celebrated 4 October 1857. Father Gaspard Mermillod, future episcopal vicar of Geneva then cardinal pronounced the sermon. He was later expelled from Switzerland by the government.

After the coming to power of an anti-clerical government, Notre Dame was occupied on 5 June 1875, and closed. This occupation was accompanied by a protest against the Roman Catholic Church and more unrests. The commitment of Catholics to this sanctuary became even greater. The building was bought by the Catholic Church in 1911.

Pontifical approbations 
 Pope Pius IX — gifted the white Carrara marble statue of the Immaculate Conception from his own private  chapel inside the Apostolic Palace. The Pontiff renamed the image "Our Lady of Geneva" and gifted it to the Bishop of Lausanne and Geneva, Cardinal Gaspard Mermillod in 20 November 1859 during a private Papal audience. The image was sculpted by Roman artisan Carlo Maria Forzani and was installed in the church on 28 December 1859 then officially consecrated to the basilica on 5 February 1860. 

 Pope Pius XI —  granted the image a decree of Pontifical coronation on 26 April 1936 to the  Bishop of Lausanne and Geneva, Marius Besson. The rite of coronation was executed via the papal nuncio Filippo Bernardini on 23 May 1937.

 Pope Pius XII — issued a decree Nominis Catholici which raised the shrine to the status of minor basilica on 4 August 1954.

Heritage 

The oldest art works of the basilica date back to the time immediately preceding the Protestant Reformation:

a torch, decorated with paintings, belonging to a convent deleted during the Protestant Reformation;
a carved wood panel with bas-relief image of the Virgin Mary, mutilated with an ax by Protestants.

Other works or art objects are the object or through the worship the statue of Our Lady of Geneva, the tabernacle and the carved liturgical furniture (altar, ambo, clams).

The stained glass windows of the basilica are particularly remarkable. Some are semi-industrial production neo-gothic, but most show the evolution of the art of stained glass during the twentieth century, in various styles, after those of Claudius Lavergne (installed from 1857 to 1875). From 1912, several artists have successively contributed to adorn the basilica: Charles Brunner, Alexandre Cingria, Maurice Denis, Gherri Moro, Paul Monnier, Jean-Claude Morend, Théodore Strawinsky. The building is classified as Cultural Property of National Significance.

Stained glass windows

References

External links 

 

Basilica churches in Switzerland
Churches in Geneva
Roman Catholic churches completed in 1857
1857 establishments in Switzerland
Gothic Revival church buildings in Switzerland
19th-century Roman Catholic church buildings in Switzerland